Pour Habit are an American punk rock band from Long Beach, California, United States. Their first demo CD, "WTF!?" is long out of print. In 2007, the band released its breakthrough album, Suiticide. After signing to Fat Wreck Chords in 2009, the album was re-released on the label that same year. Their next album, Got Your Back, was released on April 12, 2011.

Pour Habit is planning on releasing their third album, the album will be titled "Fuck It".

Current members
Chuck Green (Vocals)
Matt Hawks (Guitar)
Colin Walsh (Drums)
Eric Walsh (Guitar, Vocals)
Steve Williams (Bass, Vocals)

Former members
Shaun Nix (Guitar)

Discography

Albums
2007 Suiticide
2011 Got Your Back

Music videos
 "Evolution" (2007)
 "Heads of State" (2011)
 "Hell Bent" (2011)

Interviews
Interview: Strung Out versus Pour Habit - Thepunksite.com
Interview Pour Habit - Biav.be

External links
Fat Wreck Chords Page
Official Myspace Page

Fat Wreck Chords artists